Porcellio ferroi is a species of woodlouse in the genus Porcellio belonging to the family Porcellionidae that is endemic to Madeira.

References

Crustaceans described in 1939
Endemic fauna of Madeira
Woodlice of Europe
Porcellionidae